Cape Kjellman is a cape forming the west extremity of Belitsa Peninsula and marking the east side of the entrance to Charcot Bay, on the west side of Trinity Peninsula, Antarctica. It was first charted by the Swedish Antarctic Expedition, 1901–04, under Otto Nordenskiöld, and named by him, probably for Professor Frans Reinhold Kjellman, a Swedish botanist.

References

Headlands of Trinity Peninsula